The Soviet Union men's national volleyball team was the national volleyball team that had represented the Soviet Union in the International competitions between 1948 until 1991.

FIVB considers Russia as the inheritor of the records of Soviet Union (1948–1991) and CIS (1992).
The USSR Volleyball Federation joined the FIVB in 1948, a year after the foundation of the international governing body. The following year they triumphed in the first FIVB Men’s World Championship and have been dominating the international scene ever since, having won three Summer Olympics, six World Championships, Four World Cups and 12 European Championships.

History
The USSR Volleyball Federation joined the FIVB in 1948 and the following year they won the first World Championship. 
The Soviets were soon regularly topping the podium at international competitions such as the Olympic Games, World Championship and European Championships and the World Cup.

Medals

Results

Olympic Games
 Champions   Runners up   Third place   Fourth place

World Championship
 Champions   Runners up   Third place   Fourth place

World Cup
 Champions   Runners up   Third place   Fourth place

World League
 Champions   Runners up   Third place   Fourth place

European Championship
 Champions   Runners up   Third place   Fourth place

Goodwill Games
 Champions   Runners up   Third place   Fourth place

Team

1990 Last world Championship Squad

Head coach: Viacheslav Platanov

Coaches

References

External links
Official website
FIVB profile

National men's volleyball teams
M